Kirkham Grammar School is a selective, co-educational independent school in Kirkham, Lancashire, England. It was founded in 1549. Its roots can be traced back to the chantry school attached to St Michael's Church in the 13th century. The school remained in the church grounds until it moved to occupy its present site on Ribby Road in 1911. The front range of the school and the headmaster's house are recorded in the National Heritage List for England as a designated Grade II listed building.

School history

In 1585 the Thirty Men of Kirkham, a group which administered parish business, took control of the school. By the early part of the seventeenth century, the school had fallen into disrepair and had been without a master for seven years. Isabell Birley, an alehouse keeper, came to the rescue in 1621, presenting the Thirty Men of Kirkham with £30 for the restoration of the school.

In 1655 Henry Colburn, an old boy of the school, left money and land to the school in his will, putting it in the trust of the Worshipful Company of Drapers in London. Then began a long partnership between the company and the school, which has continued to the present day, though the Drapers surrendered control of the school in 1944, having endowed it with large extensions in 1938.

The present school building was built between 1909 and 1911 when the front range and the headmaster's house were constructed to a design by the architect F. H. Greenaway of London.  Independent status ceased temporarily in 1944 when the school became a voluntary-aided boys' grammar school. A further major extension, the Norwood Science Building was opened in 1965 and subsequently extended. In 1979 the Board of Governors took the decision to revert to independent status and Kirkham Grammar School became a co-educational school for the first time.

The last decade of the 20th century witnessed a rise in pupil numbers from 500 to 900. The school's  partnership with BAE Systems was first established in 1994. In July 2013, the school provided accommodation for teenagers attending BAE Systems' "taster weeks" 

The school applied to host a Pre-Games Olympic Training Camp before the 2012 Summer Olympics, in London. Andrew Flintoff runs a cricket academy at the school.

In recent years Kirkham Grammar School has produced a number of rugby players who have appeared at the highest level of the sport, Richard Wigglesworth and Kieran Brookes were part of the 2015 England's Six Nations squad, while Kieran Marmion was part of the Ireland squad. In Sevens rugby Daniel Bibby and Richard de Carpentier have represented England in the HSBC World Sevens Series where they came across fellow Old Boy Adam Newton playing for Spain. In 2016 Daniel Bibby became the first alumnus of the school to become an Olympian gaining a silver medal for Great Britain at the Rio Games in Sevens.

Development
The school celebrated its 450th anniversary in 1999 and has undertaken a major development programme with phase one, a science laboratories and classroom project, being completed in November 2005. The second phase, a new £1.5M extension project, was launched in May 2007 to give the school extra facilities with twelve new classrooms. The classrooms, with full Information technology (IT) multimedia teaching aids and access to laptops with wireless Internet facilities, opened in December. A time capsule was buried in the foundations.

In January 2007, the new Lawrence House Pavilion was officially opened with a performance of William Shakespeare's Much Ado About Nothing. The pavilion houses a drama studio, changing rooms, kitchen and a lounge area funded by the Lawrence House Trust, together with the Katie Caine Trust, after which the studio was named and also The Friends of Kirkham Grammar. The pavilion cost £220,000.

In October 2007, the school's sports pitch was relaid with all weather AstroTurf, and with floodlights it is also used by local community partners for sports such as hockey and football. The old pitch was recycled with part of it being used to make new pathways for North Shore Golf Club in Blackpool.

Nursery School
The Nursery School is a purpose built preschool which adjoins the junior school. It was opened in September 2003 at a cost of £250,000.

Old Kirkhamians

 Zachary Langton (1698–1788), clergyman
 Ralph Copeland (1837–1905), astronomer
 Eric Laithwaite (1921–1997), engineer
 Ronald Brown (1926 - 2019), Suffragan Bishop of Birkenhead
 Graham Clark (born 1941), opera singer
 Anthony John Lewis (1942 - 2020), mathematician, sports statistician
 Alastair Little (born 1950, died 2022), celebrity chef.
 Clive Tyldesley (born 1954), football commentator
 Tony Cocker (born 1959), former Chief Executive of E.ON UK
 John Buckley (born 1967), Professor of Military History
 Matthew Pateman (born 1969), Professor of Popular Aesthetics
 Pat Sanderson (born 1977), rugby union player
 Ranvir Singh (born 1977), television presenter 
 Tupele Dorgu (born 1977), actress
 Alex Sanderson (born 1979), rugby union player
 Mark McQueen (born 1980), film & TV director
 Richard Wigglesworth (born 1983), rugby union player
 Kieran Brookes (born 1990), rugby union player
 Richard de Carpentier (born 1990), rugby union 7s player
 Kevin Wolze (born 1990), German footballer 
 Daniel Bibby (born 1991), rugby union 7s player (Olympic Silver Medallist, Rio 2016)
 Rhys Bennett (born 1991), English footballer
 Joshua Morris (born 1991), English footballer
 Kieran Marmion (born 1992), rugby union player
 Kieran Wilkinson (born 1999), rugby union player
 James Cartmell (actor) (born 2000), actor
 Ray Ingleby, businessman, entrepreneur

Past Headmasters since 1911
 Reverend Cresswell Strange
 Dennis Norwood
 William H Kennedy
 Malcolm J Summerlee
 Barrie Stacey
Douglas Walker
 Richard Laithwaite
 Deborah Parkinson (Acting Head)
 Daniel Berry

See also

Listed buildings in Kirkham, Lancashire

References

External links 
 Official school website
 Profile on the Independent Schools Council website

Schools in the Borough of Fylde
1549 establishments in England
Educational institutions established in the 1540s
Private schools in Lancashire
Member schools of the Headmasters' and Headmistresses' Conference
 
Boarding schools in Lancashire